The Philippines participated in the 2002 Asian Games held in Busan, South Korea from September 29 to October 14, 2002. Ranked 18th with 3 gold medals, 7 silver medals and 16 bronze medals with a total of 26 over-all medals.

Asian Games Performance
Equestrian star Mikaela Cojuangco Jaworski won an individual gold medal.  Bowling stars Paeng Nepomuceno and RJ Bautista won the gold in Doubles and Billiards Francisco Bustamante and Antonio Lining won the 9-Pool Doubles.

Medalists

The following Philippine competitors won medals at the Games.

Gold

Silver

Bronze

Multiple

Medal summary

Medal by sports

External links
 Philippine Olympic Committee official website

References

Nations at the 2002 Asian Games
2002
Asian Games